Tele7ABC was a television station in Romania, which became popular in the 1990s and stopped airing in 2005. Launched in 1994, it was the second private TV channel in Romania to start airing after Antena 1. It was famous for airing such series as The Addams Family, The Fresh Prince of Bel-Air, Knight Rider, The A-Team, MacGyver, Kung Fu, and The Incredible Hulk. Tele7ABC was the broadcaster of Michael Jackson's HIStory World Tour concert in 1996 in Bucharest.

It marked the beginning of stars like Mircea Badea, Teo Trandafir, Dan Diaconescu, and Radu Coşarcă.

After getting in the control of Florin Călinescu, the television station had gone on a decline. Soon after, most of its movies were transferred to other stations, Tele7 remaining only with religious B rated movies and similar shows.

In 2005, the station temporarily closed its gates with the message that the workers were not paid in months, and they had neither any adequate sanitary facilities. Soon after, the station closed down for good.

References

 Adapted from Wikinfo article Tele7ABC, text released under the GNU Free Documentation License. 

Defunct television channels in Romania
1994 establishments in Romania
2005 disestablishments in Romania
Television channels and stations established in 1994
Television channels and stations disestablished in 2005